Gorkoye is a salt lake on the border between Bagansky and Kupinsky districts of Novosibirsk Oblast, Russia, which is almost round in shape. Its area is 741.7 hectares.

Description 
The lake is located 47 kilometers from Kupino near the village of Novoklyuchi, about 500 (or 416) kilometers from Novosibirsk.

The lake contains a high concentration of salt.

In winter the lake does not freeze, and in autumn it forms a large amount of saltpeter.

Fauna
The lake is inhabited by orange-coloured crustaceans from the genus Artemia with a length of about 7 mm.

Tourism
Along the coast of the lake, about 60 small wooden houses have been built for tourists. The curative mud from the lake is popular among visitors.

References

Gorkoye
Gorkoye